The Association for Tourism in Higher Education (ATHE), is a learned society in the United Kingdom dedicated to promoting tourism as a subject of study in the UK. It encourages high standards in learning, teaching and research. It is a member of the Academy of Social Sciences.

External links

References

Learned societies of the United Kingdom
Academic organisations based in the United Kingdom
Social sciences organizations
Tourism in Higher Education
Scholarly communication
Tourism agencies